Nubia is a fictional character appearing in DC Comics publications and related media, commonly as an ally of Wonder Woman. Historically, she is DC Comics' first Black woman superhero. Introduced in 1973 as Wonder Woman's long-lost fraternal twin, Nubia has since been presented variously as DC Comics' continuities have shifted and evolved. At turns, she has been portrayed as both a parallel-universe version of Wonder Woman and as an inheritor of the Wonder Woman mantle in a future timeline. Her Modern Era depiction is as a non-sibling Amazon contemporary of Wonder Woman, and as the successor to Wonder Woman's mother Hippolyta as queen of the Amazon nation of Themyscira. Created by Robert Kanigher and Don Heck, Nubia debuted in 1973's Wonder Woman #204 and appeared intermittently throughout Wonder Woman's Bronze Age adventures. After DC Comics rebooted its continuity in 1985 (a publication event known as the Crisis on Infinite Earths), Wonder Woman and her supporting characters were re-imagined. Though originally absent from this revised mythos, the character was reintroduced as "Nu'Bia" in 1999 by Doselle Young and Brian Denham in Wonder Woman (vol. 2) Annual #8.

The character (whose name has reverted to its original spelling) developed an expanded profile and presence in DC Comics' post-Rebirth continuity, beginning with the assumption of the Wonder Woman mantle for DC's 2021 future-timeline publication event Future State. She was heavily featured across DC's Infinite Frontier Wonder Woman publications, including the limited series Nubia & the Amazons (2021), Trial of the Amazons (2022) and Nubia: Queen of the Amazons (2022). The publisher also commissioned young adult graphic novels featuring Nubia as the central character, including Nubia: Real One (2021) and Diana & Nubia: Princesses of the Amazons (2022).

The distinction of DC's first Black woman superhero is also sometimes accorded to the Teen Titan Bumblebee, who debuted in 1976, four years after Nubia's first appearance.

Origin
Nubia was created by Robert Kanigher and Don Heck in 1973. While Kanigher had previously written Wonder Woman for nine years, he had left to work on other projects. He and then-partner Heck created Nubia in his first issue back on Wonder Woman (#204 in January 1973), part of a one-year stint for the team.

Fictional character biography

Nubia

In Wonder Woman #204 (January 1973), Diana (Wonder Woman) has her memories restored by the Amazons and is soon confronted by an armored female warrior who challenges her to single combat. The two initially wrestle, then face each other with swords. Diana and the intruder seem evenly matched until the intruder knocks the sword from Diana's hands, but then hesitates to kill her. The dark-skinned stranger introduces herself as Nubia, the one true Wonder Woman, and tells Diana that they will meet again someday to decide which of them has the right to the title. Diana's mother, Queen Hippolyta, secretly believes she recognizes Nubia, who returns to her own Floating Island.

A short Nubia story in Wonder Woman #205 picks up with her departure from Paradise Island, including a short conversation and an embrace from Hippolyta. Back on her mist-concealed Floating Island, Nubia rules a community of all men. Upon her return, two men claim the right to fight for her, citing the "law of the Floating Island" or "Mars' law of conquest". Declaring "No man will ever own Nubia!" she fights one of the men herself, defeating him but letting him live. She says, "A woman doesn't destroy life, she cherishes it!".

In Wonder Woman #206, Hippolyta flashes back to the truth, a revised version of Wonder Woman's origin story: Hippolyta had formed two babies from clay, one dark, and one light. They are brought to life by the gods, but Mars the god of war abducts baby Nubia, whom Hippolyta never sees again. Nubia is raised by Mars as his weapon of destruction against the Amazons. Mars and Nubia launch an attack on Paradise Island from their so-called "Slaughter Island". Coming to assist, Diana recognizes Mars' ring and removes it from Nubia's hand, breaking the god's mind control over Nubia. She and Diana oppose Mars, who flees, and Nubia leaves to lead her warriors "into ways of peace". Hippolyta reveals Nubia's origin to Diana.

Nubia's next appearance comes in Supergirl #9 (December 1973) written by Robert Kanigher. In the story Supergirl is made an honorary Amazon. Later when it is discovered that Nubia is suffering from a mutated shark poisoning, Hippolyta sends Kara to retrieve a rare root needed to cure her.

In Super Friends #25 (October 1979), Wonder Woman, who is temporarily under the control of the evil Overlord, is seen attempting to liberate the oppressed women of the African continent. She tells them that men still treat women as if they were possessions and it is time for women to stand up to men, with Wonder Woman as a leader. Diana is interrupted by Nubia. She tells her to back off and they fight; eventually the Overlord is defeated, and they part as friends.

Long-term publication absence
It would be 20 years between Nubia's last pre-Crisis appearance in Super Friends #25 (October 1979) and first post-Crisis appearance in Wonder Woman (vol. 2) Annual #8 (September 1999). In the interim, new Black characters in Wonder Woman were introduced, such as Philippus, created by George Perez for the 1987 reboot of the Wonder Woman comic book.

Nu'Bia

Sometime after Crisis on Infinite Earths, a new version of Nubia, now called Nu'Bia, was introduced. When Nu'Bia first meets Diana, she mistakenly calls Diana by the name of her former queen "Antiope". Nu'Bia is only slightly surprised to discover that Diana is Antiope's niece. The woman identifies herself to Diana as Nu'Bia and says that she was a Themysciran Amazon who won the "Tournament of Grace and Wonder" just as Diana previously had, and become the Amazons' first champion. Her assigned mission was to guard "Doom's Doorway", which is an entrance to the river Styx and the Tartarus Gate on Themyscira. Entering Doom's Doorway, she was to guard the entryway from the inside, stopping anyone from entering or any creature from escaping. As Diana was never told of Nu'Bia, it is assumed that the Themysciran Amazons assumed she perished during her mission long before Diana's birth. Sometime during her time in Hell, Nu'bia explains she met the Zoroastrian god of light, Ahura Mazda, and became his lover.

The next time Nu'Bia is shown, an elevator in a Las Vegas hotel suddenly manifests a golden metal lion insignia. When Diana investigates this strange occurrence, Nu'Bia steps out of the elevator. She says: "Many leagues from the kingdom of light have I traveled. Through the province of Nox and the territory of shades have I hunted the demon-king Ahriman. Finally, to track him here, to Patriarch's World...to my ancient faraway home. How passing strange it is then, Princess, that I should find you here, as well".

The demon Ahriman murdered Ahura Mazda, and carved his heart from his body. Nu'Bia had come back to earth in search of Ahriman, hoping that she can retrieve the heart and revive her lover. Nu'Bia had Ahriman in her possession and rides an elevator back to Hades to revive her beloved.

Nubia
After DC Rebirth and Infinite Frontier, Nubia was featured in a backup story in the series Future State: Immortal Wonder Woman. This depicts Nubia in Man's World. After Future State and a new version of the Multiverse were created, this version of Nubia was reintroduced as an Amazonian champion tasked with guarding Doom's Doorway, a hellish portal on Themyscira. Nubia shortly became Queen of Amazons when Hippolyta returns to Man's World to represent Diana in the newest iteration of the Justice League. When Diana returned to the living, Diana officially blessed Nubia to share her title as Wonder Woman, in addition to her new role as Queen. While Nubia is no longer Diana's twin in a literal way, the two were both born on the same day and fostered a close sister-like relationship. Nubia is also shown as having a romantic relationship with the Amazon blacksmith Io.

Other versions

Earth-23

Renee Montoya ventures forth with Earth-5's Captain Marvel in an attempt to recruit each universe's equivalent of Superman to join Nix Uotan's Army of Heaven on Earth-Zero (the primary DC Earth). The beginning of the last Final Crisis issue illustrates their visit to a universe where a Black Superman is the President of the United States. This Superman confers with a Black Wonder Woman, whom he refers to as Nubia. This Nubia is apparently one of the "Wonder Women of Amazonia", and she uses a relic called the Wonder Horn to summon Renee and the others into her world.

This version of Nubia later reappears as a member of her Earth's Justice League, with her Earth officially revealed as Earth-23 in the new Multiverse.

Wonder Woman: Earth One
Nubia appears in the 2016 graphic novel Wonder Woman: Earth One. Queen Hippolyta's closest advisor and second-in-command of the Amazons, it is revealed that she had a romantic relationship with Hippolyta.

Injustice: Gods Among Us
Nubia appears in the comic series based on the 2017 video game Injustice 2. In the prologue to Injustice 2, Nubia was appointed as the new Wonder Woman of Themyscira after Diana's actions with the Regime from the first game.

Nubia: Real One 
An original YA graphic novel Nubia: Real One, was written by L.L. McKinney and with art by Robyn Smith. According to the publisher, the story "follows a teenage Nubia as she learns to embrace her true self in a world filled with racial inequality, school violence, and other timely issues affecting young people today". It was released on February 23, 2021.

Powers and abilities

Pre-Crisis
Nubia possessed a magic sword created by Mars which was the only weapon on Earth that could counteract Diana's magic lasso. She could also glide on air currents like Wonder Woman and possessed super strength as well as all other Amazon abilities.

Post-Crisis
Nu'Bia wears special magical armor with a raised embossed lion's head on its breastplate. Nu'Bia has been shown traveling back and forth to Hades at will, and from there to other mythological realms. Typically, when she is about to appear at a new location the lion's head on her armor appears as part of the doorway, suggesting that the armor may be the source of this ability. In honor of an ancient pact, the Gorgons of the underworld blessed Nu'Bia with the "Cold Sight", which allows her to turn anyone to stone. She carries an unspecified magic sword.

Nu'Bia has 3,000 years of combat experience providing her expertise in both hand-to-hand combat as well as with handheld weapons. As a Themyscirian Amazon she also possesses immortality that allows her to live indefinitely in a youthful form, but does leave her open to potential injury and death depending on her actions. She also possesses enhanced strength and intelligence. As shown by fellow members of her tribe, she has the capability to break apart steel and concrete with her bare hands, jump over 12 feet from a standing position, has a high durability factor, enhanced healing, and the ability to absorb and process a vast amount of knowledge in a short period of time.

Nu'Bia, in addition to the other Themyscirian Amazons, possesses the ability to relieve her body of physical injury and toxins by becoming one with the Earth's soil and then reforming her body whole again. The first time Diana does this she prays to her god Gaea saying: "Gaea, I pray to you. Grant me your strength. You are the Earth who suckled me, who nurtured and bred me. Through you all life is renewed. The circle never ends. I pray you, mother Gaea, take me into your bosom. Please, let me be worthy". During writer John Byrne's time on the comic it was stated that this is a very sacred ritual to the Themyscirians, only to be used in the direst of circumstances.

In other media

 In 1975, producers of ABC's Wonder Woman television series planned for Teresa Graves to play the superheroine's black sister, but the series moved to CBS in 1977, before the character ever appeared on the show. That same year, the Mego Corporation produced a Nubia doll to tie-in with the show, advertised as "Wonder Woman's super-foe". Wearing a gladiator-styled costume which resembled a uniform Nubia wore in the comic book, the doll was also given a white streak of hair in her otherwise black hair.
 A character with a similar background appeared in the 1974 television film Wonder Woman starring Cathy Lee Crosby. In the film, written and produced by John D. F. Black and following more of a spy-adventure continuity than the comic-book one, a fellow Amazon named Ahnjayla (Anitra Ford) leaves Paradise Island and becomes a nemesis of Wonder Woman.
 Nubia is featured in the Challenge of the Super Friends digital comic, based on the series. When Wonder Woman is under the control of the evil Overlord, Nubia is seen attempting to liberate the oppressed women of the African continent. She tells them that men still treat women as if they were possessions and it is time for women to stand up to men, with Wonder Woman as leader. Diana and Nubia fight, but eventually the Overlord is defeated, and they part as friends.
 In Wonder Woman '77 Meets the Bionic Woman, the former villain Carolyn Hamilton (Jayne Kennedy) from the Wonder Woman TV series is later known as Nubia, and appears as commander of the Amazons. She marries the then-Amazon Fausta Grables at a ceremony officiated by Wonder Woman.
 Nubia is one of the five Wonder Women included in the episode 38 expansion of the MMORPG DC Universe Online. Called "Wonderverse", this expansion was released on June 30, 2020. She is voiced by Valoneecia Tolbert.

Bibliography

Nubia
Wonder Woman #204–206
Supergirl #9
Super Friends #25

Nu'Bia
Wonder Woman (vol. 2) Annual #8
Wonder Woman (vol. 2) #154–155
Wonder Woman (vol. 2) #188 (cameo)

References

External links
WW Central: Nubia
Wonder Woman Museum entry
Wonderland Wonder Woman Comix page
Amazon Archives
DCU Guide: Nu'Bia
Nubia Mego Doll Commercial

Characters created by Don Heck
Characters created by Robert Kanigher
Comics characters introduced in 1973
Comics characters introduced in 1999
DC Comics Amazons
DC Comics characters who can move at superhuman speeds
DC Comics characters who can teleport
DC Comics characters with accelerated healing
DC Comics characters with superhuman strength
DC Comics female superheroes
DC Comics female supervillains
DC Comics LGBT superheroes
DC Comics LGBT supervillains
Fictional characters with dimensional travel abilities
Fictional characters with superhuman senses
Fictional lesbians
Fictional swordfighters in comics
Fictional women soldiers and warriors
Twin characters in comics
Wonder Woman characters